Ross Andrew McLean is an English recording artist and record producer, whose first release came from Brighton-based record label, Tru Thoughts in 2003. The Saltwater EP was followed later by Out Of Luck, a second EP, released on the New York City-based record label, Bastard Jazz. His tracks and remixes have been licensed to various music compilations, TV programs and computer games, such as FIFA Street 3. He later went on to create an album of music for film under the artist name "The Lawless". The album Habit Forming was released in November 2011 by the German record label, Mille Plateaux.

References

External links
 Mawglee
 Mawglee
 Mawglee

English record producers
Living people
Year of birth missing (living people)